WhyHunger (formerly known as World Hunger Year, or WHY) is a non-profit registered 501(c)(3) organization working to end hunger and poverty by connecting people to nutritious, affordable food and by supporting grassroots solutions that inspire self-reliance and community empowerment. The organization is based on the belief that solutions and innovations are often found in the grassroots, and therefore works with more than 8,000 community-based groups across the world and has impact in 30 countries.  These groups help people to help themselves through food production, job-training programs, nutrition education, community economic development, healthcare workshops, youth programming, leadership development and more. WhyHunger's mission is to end hunger and advance the human right to nutritious food in the U.S. and around the world.

History 
Founded in September 1975 by the late musician Harry Chapin and radio host Bill Ayres, WhyHunger began as a commitment between two friends, and has grown into an award-winning global non-profit. The organization is four-star rated charity by Charity Navigator, with highest ratings for excellence in fiscal management accountability and transparency. After Harry Chapin died in a car crash in 1981, family, friends, fans and the music community worked to ensure that the vision of WhyHunger lived on. Today, Noreen Springstead serves as WhyHunger's executive director, and the organization still focuses on several fundamental principles: working together to combat the root causes of hunger, poverty and injustice, supporting grassroots solutions and promoting self-reliance.

Programs

Artists Against Hunger & Poverty 
This artists program enlists performing artists to raise funds and awareness for grassroots organizations fighting hunger and poverty across the world.  WhyHunger believes that music and the arts are an important tool in making a difference in the world.  Artists Against Hunger & Poverty founding member Bruce Springsteen has raised funds and awareness for WhyHunger and their grassroots partners for the last 20 years. Others, including Yoko Ono, Tom Morello, Jackson Browne, Brandi Carlile, Carlos Santana, O.A.R., Jason Mraz and Jen Chapin, have joined WhyHunger in the fight against hunger. Additionally, celebrity chef, cookbook author, restaurateur and Food Network star Aarón Sanchez signed on as WhyHunger's first chef ambassador. He will take part in events to raise awareness and funds for WhyHunger's work to combat the root causes of hunger and poverty.

Global Movements 
The Global Movements program works through international and U.S. civil society networks to link WhyHunger's domestic work on hunger and poverty to global movements for food sovereignty and the basic rights to food, land, water and sustainable livelihood for all people.  This program works to:
 amplify the voices of grassroots leaders
 raise awareness and support for global struggles
 advocate for public change
 build alliances across different sectors of the food system
 support sustainable and just alternatives to the predominant global systems of agriculture, food, distribution and trade.

Grassroots Action Network 
The Grassroots Action Network provides capacity building services, mentoring, training opportunities and technical assistance to transform communities and end hunger and poverty. With a network of more than 8,000 grassroots organizations, WhyHunger shares their innovations, mobilizes resources and connects them to each other in order to support their work to build healthier, sustainable communities that develop local food systems and strengthen local economies.

Hungerthon 
Started in 1975, Hungerthon is WhyHunger's annual multifaceted holiday awareness campaign and fundraising drive, bringing together celebrity supporters, and radio partners including SiriusXM and Entercom New York Stations to raise funds for the fight to end hunger and to spread awareness that hunger is a solvable problem. Hungerthon has raised millions of dollars in the fight to end hunger and invest in community-driven solutions to build social justice.

WhyHunger Chapin Awards 
The WhyHunger Chapin Awards is an annual event honoring notable artists in the space who have shown a commitment to social justice and have created change in the hunger space. Over the past 20 years, WhyHunger has honored a cadre of artists with the ASCAP Harry Chapin Humanitarian Award including Harry Belafonte, Pete Seeger, Barbra Streisand, Yoko Ono Lennon, Tom Morello, Jon Batiste, Jackson Browne, Judy Collins, Emmylou Harris, Darryl 'DMC' McDaniels, Michael McDonald, Peter, Paul & Mary, Kenny Rogers and John Mellencamp.

WhyHunger's Hunger Hotline 
WhyHunger collects and distributes information about programs that address the immediate and long-term needs of struggling families and individuals. The national WhyHunger Hotline and Find Food database (1.800.5HUNGRY or 1.800.548.6479) refers people in need of emergency food assistance to food pantries, government programs, and model grassroots organizations that work to improve access to healthy, nutritious food, and build self-reliance. The Find Food database provides information about locations of free meal sites and food pantries is also integrated into the Waze platform.

Accomplishments and campaigns

The Food Security Learning Center 
The Food Security Learning Center is a web-based clearinghouse covering topics on community food security, nutrition, federal food programs, race and the food system, the link between climate change and food production and more.  This site includes research, policy, model program profiles, articles, links and ways to get involved.

Hungerthon 
Hungerthon is WhyHunger's largest annual campaign which has featured fundraising concerts, events and a national radiothon, working with SiriusXM Satellite Radio, New York City area radio stations: WCBS Newsradio 880, Sports Radio 66 WFAN-AM, 101.9 WFAN-FM, 1010 WINS, 101.1 WCBS-FM, 92.3 NOW, 102.7 Fresh FM, WOR 710, Q104.3 FM, Z100, 103.5 KTU, Power 105.1, 106.7 Lite FM, 1280 AM WADO, with support from NewsTalkRadio 77, 95.5 WPLJ, NASH FM 94.7 and 90.7 WFUV, and other regional stations and more.  Every year the organization raises millions of dollars to combat hunger and poverty through Hungerthon.

Imagine There's No Hunger 
Imagine There's No Hunger is a global campaign inspired by John Lennon's vision of a world at peace and free from hunger.  The campaign works with Hard Rock International and Yoko Ono Lennon to help children throughout the world realize their own power to change their lives.  Through Imagine There's No Hunger, WhyHunger hopes to inspire children to engage themselves and their families as active participants in growing food in their school yard, establishing community farms and developing sustainable agroecological production methods.  WhyHunger is ensuring that children have lasting access to nutritious food via long-term, sustainable solutions that rebuild local food and farm economies.  Through Imagine There's No Hunger, more than $5.6 million has been raised to fight childhood hunger and more than 7.2 million meals have been provided for children in need from 22 countries around the world. Each year, the campaign is highlighted in November and December, raising funds and awareness via celebrity events, the sale of signature John Lennon "Imagine" merchandise at Hard Rock properties across the globe and online action tied to the hashtag #ImagineNoHunger.

John Lennon App 
John Lennon: The Bermuda Tapes is an interactive app for iPod, iPad and iPod Touch that tells the story of John Lennon's journey to Bermuda and creative renewal in June 1980.  Integrating excerpts of Lennon's demo tapes, some previously unreleased, recorded in Bermuda with game play and documentary storytelling, the app features rare and unreleased rare photos, interviews and handwritten lyric sheets.  Users can listen to Lennon tell the tale of his journey as he battled storms at sea and found inspiration in Bermuda.  The app was released in November 2013 and has since received high ratings and was nominated for a SXSW Interactive Award.  All revenues for the app go toward WhyHunger and the Imagine There's No Hunger campaign's efforts to combat hunger and poverty. The album app is directed by Emmy and Peabody Award-winning filmmaker Michael Epstein and veteran digital artist Mark Thompson.

Charity ratings 
Each year since 2011, WhyHunger has received the highest rating of four stars for excellence in fiscal management, accountability and transparency from Charity Navigator.  WhyHunger spends 89% of all funds directly on programs and 11% on fundraising and administration.  WhyHunger is a BBB accredited charity and GuideStar named WhyHunger a Silver-level GuideStar Exchange participant, for demonstrating its commitment to transparency.

References

External links

Hungerthon
John Lennon Bermuda Tapes app

Hunger relief organizations
Charities based in New York (state)
Organizations established in 1975
Development charities based in the United States
501(c)(3) organizations